Argyresthia ruidosa is a moth of the family Yponomeutidae. It is found in North America, including New Mexico.

Adults are pale golden in color.

References

Moths described in 1940
Argyresthia
Moths of North America